David S. Sutherland (born 1948/1949) is an American businessman, and the non-executive chairman of U.S. Steel, since January 2014, when he succeeded John P. Surma.

Early life
Sutherland earned a bachelor's degree from the University of Saskatchewan and an MBA from the  Katz Graduate School of Business at the University of Pittsburgh.

Career
Sutherland worked for 30 years for IPSCO Steel, the last five as president and CEO.

In 2008, Sutherland became a main board director of U.S. Steel.

In January 2014, he succeeded John P. Surma as chairman of U.S. Steel.

Sutherland is a director of GATX and Imperial Oil.

References

Living people
American chief executives of manufacturing companies
U.S. Steel people
1940s births
University of Saskatchewan alumni
Joseph M. Katz Graduate School of Business alumni